The 25-30 Alliance is an alliance of independents created to run in the 2015 Egyptian parliamentary election of 17 October to 2 December 2015.

Creation
The name of the alliance refers to the revolution that overthrew Hosni Mubarak on 25 January 2011 and the overthrow of Mohamed Morsi on 30 June 2013. In July 2014, members of the April 6 Youth Movement and Tamarod stated that they would join the alliance. The Free Egyptians Party stated that it might join the alliance. The alliance stated in March 2015 that it was not part of the Reawakening of Egypt list.

Abdel-Hakim Abdel Nasser, son of former Egyptian president Gamal Abdel Nasser, was one of the founders of the alliance.

Structure
, the 25-30 Alliance was led by Haitham El-Hariri.

Policies and strategy
The alliance included 25% quotas for women and youth in its electoral lists.

The electoral strategy of the members of the alliance was to run for individual seats rather than as a formal group.

2015 Parliament
The 25-30 Alliance obtained 14 seats in the 2015 Egyptian parliamentary election.

On 14 February 2019, 25-30 Alliance member of parliament Ahmed Tantawi was one of the 16 members who voted against the parliamentary motion for amending the Egyptian constitution that led to the 2019 Egyptian constitutional referendum in April 2019. The motion was supported by 485 members.

References

2014 establishments in Egypt
Political opposition organizations
Political party alliances in Egypt
Politics of Egypt
Political parties established in 2014